Pengo is a South-Central Dravidian language spoken in Nabarangpur district of Odisha by the Pengo Poraja people. Most speakers are fluent in Odia.

Phonology

References

External links
Pengo basic lexicon at the Global Lexicostatistical Database

Agglutinative languages
Dravidian languages